Canteen Township is located in St. Clair County, Illinois. As of the 2010 census, its population was 10,263 and it contained 4,027 housing units. Canteen Township was formed from Centreville Station Township when it was subdivided on March 5, 1910.

Geography

Demographics

References

External links
St. Clair County Official Site
Illinois State Archives

Townships in St. Clair County, Illinois
Townships in Illinois